Walk of Life is the second and final studio album by pop singer Billie Piper, released in 2000. Piper's second album (her first released under her full name) produced three Top 30 singles in the UK – "Day & Night" (number 1), "Something Deep Inside" (number 4), and "Walk of Life" (number 25). The album itself reached number 14, the same position as her debut, but only reaching a Silver certification.

The album was originally released in Japan in July 2000, although release in other markets was delayed until October 2000 with different artwork and track listing, including remixed versions of "Something Deep Inside" and "Walk of Life". The album was not released in the US.

Track listing

Notes
The Japanese edition of the album doesn't only have a different front cover but also a different booklet, back cover, CD artwork, etc.
The original version of "Something Deep Inside" can only be found on the Japanese version of this album. All international versions of the album contain the Radio Mix. The Japanese edition also has the unmixed version of "Walk of Life", which also can only be found on the Japanese edition.
A new mix of "Makin' My Way" (originally featured on the Pokémon: The First Movie soundtrack) was released on the Japanese version of the album. This mix and "First Love" were both replaced on international releases with "Bring It On" and "What Game Is This?"
"The Tide Is High", a cover of a song performed by The Paragons later covered by Blondie, was to be the fourth single from the album. Piper states in her book Growing Pains that she told Virgin Records not to bother releasing "The Tide Is High" as a single because she was worn out and didn't want to sing any more after appearing in court against a woman named Juliet Peters who had given Piper, her friends and her family numerous death threats. A single mix and remixes were commissioned but never released. Piper also samples the line "Do you have a girlfriend?" taken from her second number-one hit single "Girlfriend". Because of this, the producers of the track recycled the production for Atomic Kitten's very similar recording of the song in 2002.
"First Love", scrapped from the original track listing, was later used as the B-side to some releases of "Something Deep Inside".

Personnel
Billie Piper – vocals
Eliot Kennedy – producer
Tim Lever – producer, writer, musician
Jim Marr – producer, mixing, programming, keyboards, guitar, bass guitar
Wendy Page – producer, mixing, backing vocals, vocal arrangement
Alexander Guardian – backing vocals

Release history

Charts

References

Billie Piper albums
2000 albums
Virgin Records albums